The Philadelphia Union are an American professional soccer club based in the Philadelphia metropolitan area. The Union compete in Major League Soccer (MLS) as a member of the Eastern Conference. Founded on February 28, 2008, the club began playing in 2010 as an expansion team. The club's home stadium is Subaru Park, a soccer-specific stadium located in Chester, Pennsylvania on the banks of the Delaware River.

The Union are currently owned by Keystone Sports & Entertainment, with Jay Sugarman serving as majority owner and chairman of the club. Professional basketball player Kevin Durant also serves as a minority owner. The club's current head coach is Jim Curtin. Curtin has been coaching the Union since 2014. The Union finished as runners-up in the 2014, 2015 and 2018 U.S. Open Cup tournaments and the 2022 MLS Cup final. In 2020, Philadelphia secured the Supporters' Shield, winning the first title in the club's history.

History

Drive for expansion

Despite being one of the ten largest metropolitan areas in the country and a top-five media market, the Philadelphia area was not represented when Major League Soccer kicked off in 1996. Philadelphia was previously represented by the Philadelphia Atoms (1973–76) and Philadelphia Fury (1978–80) in the FIFA-backed, major professional North American Soccer League (NASL). The Atoms won the Soccer Bowl in their inaugural 1973 season. Philadelphia goalkeeper and Ridley Park, Pennsylvania native Bob Rigby became the first soccer player to be featured on the cover of Sports Illustrated following the club's championship. The Atoms folded after the 1976 season, having been bought by Mexican owners whose plans to move the team to San Antonio were not approved by the league. The Atoms and the Fury both played at Veterans Stadium, though the Atoms played their final season in Philadelphia at Franklin Field. The NASL folded in 1984, leaving the United States without a top-level soccer league until Major League Soccer (MLS) began play in 1996.

The first effort to bring professional soccer back to the Delaware Valley commenced in 2001, when a group of investors attempted to bring an MLS franchise to Trenton, New Jersey. The centerpiece of their efforts was a $31 million soccer-specific stadium to be built across the street from the CURE Insurance Arena and with access to the under-construction NJ Transit River Line. "Union FC" was the intended name for the Trenton MLS team if it came to fruition. However, the MetroStars (now the New York Red Bulls) held the right to block a franchise in Trenton, as it would infringe on their 75-mile competition-free zone.

Five years later, plans were in place to construct a 20,000-capacity stadium on the campus of Rowan University in Glassboro, New Jersey. The stadium would serve as the home field for both an MLS expansion club and Rowan's football team. Ultimately, $100 million in state bonds to fund the stadium and various other improvements on the Rowan campus were dropped by New Jersey Governor Jon Corzine. Shortly after the Rowan proposal fell through, Keystone Sports & Entertainment (the group that would eventually own the Union) looked at a site underneath the Commodore Barry Bridge in Chester to develop a soccer-specific stadium.

In 2007, the Sons of Ben supporter group formed to raise interest toward a Major League Soccer team in Philadelphia. They are credited with demonstrating to MLS an established fan base in the market.

Major League Soccer added Philadelphia as its sixteenth team on February 28, 2008. The finalization of the club was the result of a $47 million package approved by Delaware County politicians and Pennsylvania governor, Ed Rendell, that included the cost of Subaru Park and a major urban renewal project.

In December 2009, the Union added the Reading Rage youth soccer organization as their official minor league affiliate in the USL Premier Development League. As a result, the Rage were rebranded as "Reading United AC" with a new logo and colors for the 2010 PDL season. In the 2010 MLS SuperDraft, the Union selected forward Danny Mwanga from Oregon State University as the number one pick, as well as sixth and seventh picks Amobi Okugo from UCLA and Jack McInerney from the U.S. U-17 National Team in the first round. In March 2010, the Union signed an affiliation agreement with the Harrisburg City Islanders of the United Soccer League. And in January 2012, the Union formed their first international partnership with Deportivo Saprissa of the Costa Rican Primera División.

Inaugural season
The Union played their inaugural game on March 25, 2010, in which they lost 2–0 to Seattle Sounders FC at Qwest Field. Sébastien Le Toux became the first player to score a goal for Philadelphia in their home opener on April 10, 2010, a 3–2 win over D.C. United at Lincoln Financial Field. The team again played Seattle Sounders FC for the first match at Subaru Park on June 27, 2010. Le Toux scored the Union's initial goal at the venue from a penalty kick, which was instrumental to their 3–1 victory.  All 12,000 season ticket packages for 2010 were sold prior to this opener. At the end of the inaugural season the Union finished 7th in the Eastern Conference and 14th overall in the league with a record of 8–15–7 (W-L-T).

The Piotr Nowak era (2010–12)
The Union picked up three players in the 2011 MLS SuperDraft, most notably Zac MacMath, who was the fifth overall draft pick. On January 11, 2011, the Union acquired shirt sponsor Bimbo Bakeries USA. On January 20, Philadelphia introduced two new players: Colombians Faryd Mondragón (GK) and Carlos Valdés (D). Mondragón had recently come from playing with 1. FC Köln in the German Bundesliga, and has at least 50 caps with the Colombia national team. Valdés came from Independiente Santa Fe in the Colombian First Division, where he served as captain before coming to Philadelphia. The Union also signed during the summer transfer window US International Freddy Adu.

The team made a complete turnaround in the 2011 season, finishing 3rd in the Eastern Conference and 8th overall in the league with a record of 11–8–15 (W-L-T) scoring 44 goals and allowing 36. This marked the first time the Philadelphia Union qualified for the MLS Cup Playoffs. The Union had a stellar start of the season that saw them win 4 and only lost 1 of their first six league games. In the 2011 MLS Cup Playoffs the Union lost the first leg of the MLS Eastern Conference semi-finals 2–1 at home on October 30, 2011, with the 1st playoff Union goal coming from Sebastien Le Toux. The Union then lost the 2nd leg 1–0 on November 3, 2011, against the future MLS Cup finalist Houston Dynamo.

Nowak to Hackworth (2012–14)
John Hackworth became the Unions' interim coach on June 13, 2012, receiving the role permanently on August 30, 2012. The Union finished their third season in eighth place in the Eastern Conference and fifteenth in MLS overall, with a record of 10–18–6 (W-L-T), scoring 37 goals and allowing 45. Antoine Hoppenot, who was selected in the third round of the 2012 Supplemental Draft, netted four goals within 817 minutes of play. Subaru Park, then known as PPL Park, was the site of the 2012 MLS All-Star Game in which the MLS All-Stars defeated Chelsea F.C., 3–2. The Union also made it to the semifinals of the 2012 Lamar Hunt U.S. Open Cup after defeating the Rochester Rhinos 3–0 in the third round and winning against D.C. United on the road 2–1, after extra time, in the fourth round. They subsequently defeated the Harrisburg City Islanders, their main affiliate at the time, 5–2 in the quarterfinals.

The Union traded allocation money in order to take the first overall pick, which was used on goalkeeper and Jamaican international Andre Blake. They then traded down multiple times in order to select Coastal Carolina University midfielder Pedro Ribeiro. Other new, preseason acquisitions included Maurice Edu, French midfielder Vincent Nogueira, Argentinian midfielder Cristian Maidana, and former MLS Rookie of the Year defender Austin Berry. Despite these additions, the Union still languished in mediocrity, winning just two of their first 14 games, posting a record of 2–7–5 (W-L-T). On April 20, 2014, the Union traded forward Jack McInerney to the Montreal Impact for winger Andrew Wenger, a Lancaster, Pennsylvania native. Hackworth's coaching career with the Union ended on June 10, 2014.

Jim Curtin takes charge (2014–present)
Although failing to make the playoffs, the Union reached the 2014 Lamar Hunt U.S. Open Cup finals for the first time in the club's history. During the offseason, the club traded for forward C. J. Sapong from Sporting Kansas City. They also traded long time defensive midfielder Amobi Okugo to Orlando City SC. Other new preseason acquisitions included FC Nantes loanee Fernando Aristeguieta, S.L. Benfica loanee Steven Vitória, and free agent Cameroonian 18-year-old midfielder Eric Ayuk. During the 2015 MLS SuperDraft the Union drafted forward Dzenan Catic from Bosnia-Herzegovina, midfielder Eric Bird, and defender Raymond Lee. During the expansion draft, Orlando City SC drafted Philadelphia midfielder Pedro Ribeiro. Despite all the offseason transactions, the Union only registered one win in their first ten league games with a record of 1–6–3 (W-L-T).

During the 2015 summer transfer window, the Union traded longtime defender Sheanon Williams to the Houston Dynamo for allocation money, which they used to sign Swiss midfielder Tranquillo Barnetta on July 29, 2015. The club achieved a successful run in the 2015 Lamar Hunt U.S. Open Cup, earning a second consecutive appearance in the Open Cup final. This match took place against Sporting Kansas City, at Subaru Park on September 30, 2015.

In 2016, the Union would acquire Chris Pontius from D.C. United, Surinames midfielder Roland Alberg, and Brazilian right midfielder Ilsinho. They would also acquire U.S. international Alejandro Bedoya in the summer transfer window. The Union would also add key players from the 2016 MLS SuperDraft including Josh Yaro, Keegan Rosenberry, and Fabian Herbers. The 2016 season saw success from Goalkeeper Andre Blake who later would win the 2016 MLS Goalkeeper of the Year Award. The Union were in constant playoff contention, however went 0–5–2(W-L-T) in the final 7 matches of the regular season. The Union would still reach the playoffs for only the 2nd time in team history, beating out New England Revolution on goal differential. The Union were beaten 3–1 in the Knockout round of the 2016 MLS Cup Playoffs by Toronto FC.

The Union were unable to build on their 2016 success, finishing with the same record but still missing the playoffs in 2017. Despite failing to make the playoffs, Curtin was announced to retain his head coach position for the 2018 season.

Ahead of the 2019 season, Union Sporting Director, Ernst Tanner, announced that Curtin would be retained for the upcoming season on a one-year extension. By July of that season, the Union reach first place in the Eastern Conference and hitting the club's best start to a season. This success lead to the club announcing Curtin signed a two-year contract extension, to remain head coach through the 2021 season.

First trophy and success
The 2020 season was the most successful to date for the Union. Despite disruptions from the COVID-19 pandemic, the Union reached the semi-final of the MLS is Back Tournament and went on to win their first trophy finishing top of the league standings and earning the 2020 Supporters' Shield. The team's performance over the season earned Curtin his first Sigi Schmid Coach of the Year Award. Winning the Supporter's Shield earned the Union their debut in the CONCACAF Champions League, where the Union earned their first international win against Deportivo Saprissa; a victory that marked Curtin's 100th win as head coach of the club.

Within two days prior to the Union's first ever conference final match in team history, it was reported that 11 players, including six starters had to undergo the league's COVID-19 protocol. Philadelphia lost to eventual champions New York City FC 2–1. It was later stated that it would've been impossible to delay the game, as the players would not have been available for the MLS Cup Final.

On July 8, 2022, the Philadelphia Union defeated D.C. United 7–0, setting a club record and tying the MLS record for biggest goal differential win. The overall season proved to be special, as Philadelphia topped the Eastern table with 67 points—equal with Supporters' Shield winners Los Angeles FC (and with better goal differential but lost out due to MLS' tiebreaker of total wins). Philadelphia beat FC Cincinnati in the conference semifinals, 1–0, on a Leon Flach goal, and then defeated defending champions New York City FC 3–1 in the conference finals to advance to their first-ever MLS Cup final.

In MLS Cup, the Union erased 1−0 and 2−1 deficits and center back Jack Elliott scored twice in the match, including late in extra time. Ultimately LAFC came back to force penalties and won the Cup in a penalty shoot-out.

Colors and badge

On May 11, 2009, the Philadelphia Union's name, crest, and colors were officially announced during a ceremony held at Philadelphia City Hall.  "Union" alludes to the union of the Thirteen Colonies, of which Philadelphia was the first capital as well as the area's historic role with the labor movement. The name was chosen following a fan poll held between January 19, 2009, and February 6, 2009; the other three options were AC Philadelphia, SC Philadelphia, and Philadelphia City.

The Union's colors are navy blue and gold, representing the primary colors of the Continental Army's uniforms during the American Revolutionary War. The team's crest is circular, symbolizing unity. Its thirteen gold stars represent the original Thirteen Colonies, while the shield's contour derives from the Philadelphia coat of arms. The rattlesnake pays homage to the "Join, or Die" political cartoon by Benjamin Franklin that was featured in the 1754 Pennsylvania Gazette, and is also reminiscent of the Gadsden flag, another Revolutionary icon.  The light blue in the middle of the crest is a tribute to the Sons of Ben, and is further derived from the civic flag of Philadelphia. Coincidentally, the navy blue, gold, and light blue colors of the Union are also the predominant colors in the state flags of Pennsylvania, New Jersey, and Delaware. The team's secondary logo is a simplified version of the aforementioned design consisting of the blue shield with the rattlesnake, augmented with a gold border and a ribbon bearing the team's official motto:  "jungite aut perite", a Latin translation of the phrase "join or die", which was also used in the 1754 Benjamin Franklin political cartoon mentioned above. The Philadelphia Union's name and colors also allude to the state's important role during the Civil War.

In February 2013, the team unveiled a third uniform that commemorated Bethlehem Steel F.C., one of the most successful early American soccer clubs. The kit was primarily black with white trim, featuring a sublimated Union emblem, and a Bethlehem Steel F.C. jock tag.

Sponsorship

On January 11, 2011, the Philadelphia Union announced a four-year agreement with Bimbo Bakeries USA to be its official jersey sponsor. The company's U.S. headquarters is located in the Philadelphia suburb of Horsham, thus providing local and global exposure to the team. It was also announced that Bimbo will be the official bread and baked goods partner of both the Union and Major League Soccer, as well as an overall league sponsor.

The sponsorship deal is valued at about $12 million.

Bimbo and the Union agreed in 2014 to renew their sponsorship arrangement for five years at an annual value of $2.3 million.

On November 26, 2014, the Union announced the Milton, Delaware-based Dogfish Head Brewery as their official beer sponsor. The deal included the establishment of a beer garden at Subaru Park.

Stadium 
 Subaru Park; Chester, Pennsylvania (2010–present)
 Lincoln Financial Field; Philadelphia (2010)

The Union play most of their games at Subaru Park (formerly Talen Energy Stadium, and prior to that PPL Park), an 18,500-seat soccer-specific stadium located at the southwesterly corner of the Commodore Barry Bridge (U.S. Route 322).  The structure was designed by Rossetti Architects and the ICON Venue Group, with the actual construction contracted to the Ardmore-based T.N. Ward Company.  Subaru Park's design allows clear views of the Delaware River for approximately sixty percent of its spectators, and is the centerpiece of Chester's urban renewal process.  The Environmental Protection Agency (EPA) worked with the city of Chester to ensure that construction activities did not impact the nearby parking facility which had been the site of the Wade Dump, a previously polluted Superfund site.  The Union train at YSC Sports in Wayne, a community located 17 miles north of Chester.

In addition to Subaru Park, the Union also plays select games at Lincoln Financial Field, the home stadium of the NFL's Philadelphia Eagles and the NCAA's Temple University Owls football team.  Prior to the completion of the then PPL Park, the Union played their home opener at Lincoln Financial Field on April 10, 2010, against D.C. United as well as their May 15 match against FC Dallas.  Originally just scheduled to play only the home opener at Lincoln Financial Field, the second game was played there due to construction delays at Subaru Park.  Lincoln Financial Field remains the team's secondary home, for matches with anticipated high attendances, such as a friendly against Manchester United, during their 2010 tour of North America. For the home opener, the team limited ticket sales to the lower bowl and club sections, totaling about 37,500 seats. On June 27, the Union officially opened their home with a 3–2 win over Seattle Sounders FC. Lincoln Financial Field also hosts international friendlies involving teams other than the Union; the most recent being Real Madrid against the Scottish Premier League's Celtic FC in August 2012.  Celtic FC met with the Union in their first international friendly in July 2010.

Training facility 

The Philadelphia Union training fields are right outside Subaru Park; Chester, Pennsylvania. The training complex features 2 grass fields that were constructed in fall 2014. Prior to having dedicated training fields, the Union was practicing at a nearby municipal park called Chester Park or directly at Subaru Park.

In 2016, the Philadelphia Union opened a 16,500 square foot training facility and offices built in the former machine shop of the Chester Waterside Station of the Philadelphia Electric Company.

Youth development

Second team 

On August 19, 2015, the team announced that they would operate a reserve team in Bethlehem, Pennsylvania that will compete in the United Soccer League (USL) starting in 2016 with matches being played at Lehigh University's Goodman Stadium. As a part of the announcement, the Union agreed to dissolve their partnership with the Harrisburg City Islanders.
On October 27, 2015, Bethlehem Steel FC's name, crest, and colors were officially announced during a ceremony held at the ArtsQuest at SteelStacks. "Steel FC" alludes to the historical Bethlehem Steel F.C. soccer club, which played from 1907 to 1930. The name was chosen following a fan poll held between September 8, 2015, and September 30, 2015. In December 2019, the Union announced that the Bethlehem Steel identity would be retired ahead of the 2020 season and the club would become known as Philadelphia Union II. On December 6, 2021, the Union II announced the team would join the newly established MLS Next Pro.

Philadelphia Union Academy 

The Philadelphia Union operates an elite youth Academy training and competition program starting with the Under-9 age group and running through Under-17, after which players graduate to Union II, the Philadelphia Union's second team.

As for competition, the Union participates in MLS Next starting with the Under-13 age group. MLS Next is an elite North American youth soccer league organized, managed, and controlled by Major League Soccer. The league was launched in 2020. The Union's younger age groups from Under-9 through Under-12 participate in various regional leagues and tournaments, often playing one year up. The Union Academy teams train and compete in Wayne, Pennsylvania, as well as in Chester, Pennsylvania, home of Philadelphia Union's first team organization.

While the Union's competition rosters in MLS Next are composed of boys teams representing age groups Under-13 through Under-17, the Union Academy is unusual in that with many of its young players are competing with and even starting for the Union's USL Championship team, Union II. Widely considered one of the top youth academies affiliated with an MLS club, the Union Academy has seen success in tournaments both domestic and international.

The Union Academy sources talent internally through the Union Junior Academy, as well as externally through well-regarded local area programs such as FC Delco, Real Jersey FC, and The SWAG. Families have even been known to relocate to Pennsylvania to take advantage of the many benefits provided through the Union Academy such as admittance to the YSC Academy, a world class soccer training and college preparatory school that operates in an alliance with the Union Academy.

The Philadelphia Union Academy has produced numerous players for the Philadelphia Union, Union II, elite NCAA programs, and professional clubs across the world.

YSC Academy 

Between 70 and 80 of the Philadelphia Union Academy's players attend private school YSC Academy which was founded by Philadelphia Union investor Richie Graham in September 2013 as an innovative, first-of its-kind, soccer-specific school for elite soccer players from grades 6 through 12. The school has campuses in Wayne, Pennsylvania and at the Union's training complex in Chester, Pennsylvania and is designed for student-athletes who aspire to play professional-level soccer. YSC Academy's first graduating class was in 2015. A substantial portion of the school's graduates have gone on to play professionally for the Philadelphia Union and other teams, with the balance going to college.

Club culture

Supporters 

Grassroots support was instrumental to the founding of the Philadelphia Union and the construction of Subaru Park.  This backing came in the form of a supporters group known as the Sons of Ben, which was founded in January 2007.  The Sons of Ben petitioned Major League Soccer to expand to the Philadelphia market until the official expansion announcement was made in January 2008.  Named for Founding Father and Philadelphia icon, Benjamin Franklin, the group was included in the expansion press conference, singing their anthem, "I'm Looking Over a Four Leaf Clover", and closing the event by presenting scarves to the ownership group. They were also present on May 11, 2009, for the naming ceremony at City Hall.

While the Sons of Ben are the predominant and official supporters group, smaller supporters groups also exist. These include the Tammany Saints (sections 101 and 133), the IllegitimateS (section 133), the Corner Creeps (section 134), the Bridge Crew (sections 120–121), La Union Latina (section 114), The Keystone State Ultras (section 140), and the Chester Soccer Casuals (section 140).

Rivalries 

The Philadelphia Union's primary rivals are the New York Red Bulls and New York City FC. These rivalries exist primarily because of geographical proximity and the traditional animosities between the metropolitan areas of Philadelphia and New York City in other professional sports leagues.

Most Union fans have considered the New York Red Bulls to be a traditional rival due to the team's stadium being the closest in proximity to the Union's, leading to substantial away support from each team's fan bases every time the two sides play. There have been many consequential games played between the two sides, including the Union's first playoff win in team history. However, many New York Red Bulls fans do not consider the Union to be one of their main rivals, as NYCFC and D.C. United are their main antagonists.

In recent years, the Philadelphia Union's most meaningful rivalry has been with New York City FC. Though early fixtures between the two clubs did spark tensions between the two sets of fans, the rivalry reached a new level after New York City controversially eliminated the Union in the 2021 Eastern Conference Final, after the latter lost 11 players, including 6 starters, due to MLS' COVID-19 protocols. In a fixture between the two sides at Subaru Park on June 16, 2022, an altercation occurred during a stoppage in play between New York City players and a member of the Philadelphia Union medical staff who was treating an injured player on the field. This resulted in a red card being shown to the trainer Paul Rushing, and expletives can be heard being shouted from the home fans.  The winning goal of the game was scored by the Union in the 96th minute, leading to an eruption from the crowd, including a smoke bomb being thrown onto the field. After the game ended, Union player José "El Brujo" Martínez was photographed showing both middle fingers to the traveling NYCFC supporters. This game marks a major development in the rivalry. The Union would avenge their 2021 Eastern Conference final loss, defeating NYCFC 3–1 at home to win the 2022 Eastern Conference final, and earn their first ever appearance in an MLS Cup final.

Another rivalry with Los Angeles FC has started to take shape, more-so because of events on the field than animosity between fans, as many entertaining and heated fixtures between the two teams have occurred since LAFC joined the league. MLS Cup 2022 between LAFC and the Philadelphia Union ended in a 3-3 draw after extra time that eventually led to LA winning via a penalty shootout. LAFC also won the Supporter's Shield in 2022, being crowned champions of the regular season over the Philadelphia Union thanks to MLS' win record tie-breaker. This tie-breaker differs from the more common goal differential tie-breaker used in most other professional soccer leagues in the world. The Philadelphia had a higher goal-differential at the conclusion of the 2022 regular season than LAFC.

The Union also has several other minor rivals. A smaller rivalry with D.C. United took shape early on due to their geographical proximity compared to other teams in the league. Other teams such as the New England Revolution and Atlanta United F.C. have been considered rivals to some extent in recent years due to many intense and important games against them, and some controversial moments. The Union also had a period of rivalry with Seattle Sounders FC despite the two teams playing in different MLS conferences. The Philadelphia Union played its inaugural MLS game and stadium opener against the Seattle Sounders. The rivalry was further cultivated by the 2014 Lamar Hunt U.S. Open Cup final.

Broadcasting 

Until the 2022 season, WPHL-TV and WPVI-TV were the main English-language television broadcasters for Union matches not carried by Major League Soccer's national media partners, with JP Dellacamera on play-by-play. The broadcasts were produced by WPVI, and part of the package was aired by the station. Prior to the 2018 season, CSN Philadelphia (now NBC Sports Philadelphia) produced the games for 6ABC, removing the NBC peacock from its graphics.

During the 2012 MLS season, seventeen select home and road matches were broadcast on radio by WIP. The Union also collaborated with WIP on a weekly hour-long soccer show. Beginning with the MLS is Back Tournament in July 2020, the Union moved to WDAS.

From 2023, every Union match is available via MLS Season Pass on the Apple TV app.

Players

Current roster

Reserves

Management

Current staff

Head coaches 

This list includes all those who have managed the club since 2010, when the club joined Major League Soccer for the first time, whether coaching on a full-time or interim basis. Games played include all League, Cup, Playoff, and the win percentage is calculated from the total of games.

. Includes all competitive matches

M = Matches played; W = Matches won; D = Matches drawn; L = Matches lost;

Sporting directors

Ownership 

Keystone Sports & Entertainment (S&E) owns the Philadelphia Union and Bethlehem Steel FC. Jay Sugarman, (CEO) of iStar Financial, leads this group including Christopher F. Buccini, Robert Buccini, and David B. Pollin – co-founders of the Buccini/Pollin Group; Joseph J. Greco, chairman of the RevSpring technology company and president of Premier Management Services; and David Seltzer, principal and co-founder of the Mercator financial advisors. Nick Sakiewicz was the former CEO and investor in Keystone S&E until October 3, 2015, when Sugarman purchased his shares in the club and discontinued his involvement. His termination was primarily due to his strained relationship with the Union's fanbase, which blamed Sakiewicz for the team's mediocre record.

On June 15, 2020, it was announced that basketball player Kevin Durant had become an investor and community partner for the club, purchasing five percent of the club with potentially another five percent in the near future.

Honors

Team
In 2020, Philadelphia Union won their first major MLS trophy, the Supporter's Shield.

Team records

Year-by-year 

This is a partial list of the last five seasons completed by the Union. For the full season-by-season history, see List of Philadelphia Union seasons.

1. Avg. attendance include statistics from league matches only.
2. Top goalscorer(s) includes all goals scored in League, MLS Cup Playoffs, U.S. Open Cup, MLS is Back Tournament, CONCACAF Champions League, FIFA Club World Cup, and other competitive continental matches.

International competitions

Player records

Most goals

Bold signifies current Union player

Other player records 

As of October 22, 2022 
Stats only include MLS regular season matches. These do not include domestic cup, international, or playoff matches. 

Field players

 Games played: Raymon Gaddis (221)
 Minutes played: Raymon Gaddis (18,702)
 Goals: Sébastien Le Toux (50)
 Assists: Sébastien Le Toux (50)
 Shots: Sébastien Le Toux (320)
 Shots on goal: Sébastien Le Toux (144)
 Game-winning goals: Sébastien Le Toux (10)
 Penalty kick goals: Sébastien Le Toux (8)
 Multi-goal games: Sébastien Le Toux (4)
 Hat tricks: Julián Carranza, Daniel Gazdag (2)

Goalkeepers

 Games played: Andre Blake (205)
 Minutes played: Andre Blake (18,413)
 Wins: Andre Blake (90)
 Goals against average: Faryd Mondragón (1.06)
 Saves: Andre Blake (635)
 Shutouts: Andre Blake (65)

See also 

 All-time Philadelphia Union roster
 Sports in Philadelphia

References

External links 

 

 
U
Soccer clubs in Pennsylvania
Association football clubs established in 2008
2008 establishments in Pennsylvania
Chester, Pennsylvania
Major League Soccer teams
CONCACAF Champions League
Soccer clubs in the United States